Sarab-e Garm Garab (also Romanized as Sarāb-e Garm Garāb; also known as Sarāb-e Garāb) is a village in Dowlatabad Rural District, in the Central District of Ravansar County, Kermanshah Province, Iran. At the 2006 census, its population was 93, in 22 families.

References 

Populated places in Ravansar County